Lisnadarragh Wedge Tomb is a prehistoric site, a wedge tomb about  west of Carrickmacross, in County Monaghan near the border with County Cavan, in Ireland.

Description
There are about 400 wedge tombs in Ireland. They are a type of gallery grave, and date from the transition between the Neolithic Age and the Bronze Age.

The sides of the tomb are defined by 20 orthostats, which decrease in size from south-west to north-east, the largest, at the entrance, being of height . It is roofless; a roof slab lies near the gallery.

See also
 List of megalithic monuments in Ireland
 Irish megalithic tombs

References

Archaeological sites in County Monaghan
Tombs in the Republic of Ireland